Charles Washington McClammy (May 29, 1839 – February 26, 1896) was a Democratic representative elected from North Carolina’s 3rd congressional district.
He was born at Scotts Hill, North Carolina. He pursued an academic course and was graduated from the University of North Carolina at Chapel Hill in 1859.
Following his school career, McClammy began teaching from 1859-1861. He enlisted in the Confederate Army in 1861, and by successive promotions became major in the Third North Carolina Cavalry Regiment and served throughout the American Civil War.
McClammy also engaged in agricultural pursuits at Scotts Hill. He was a member of the State house of representatives in 1866, served in the State senate in 1871 and was elected as a Democrat to the Fiftieth and  Fifty-first Congresses (March 4, 1887 – March 3, 1891).
He resumed agricultural pursuits while he was an unsuccessful candidate for reelection in 1890 to the Fifty-second Congress. McClammy died in a boiler explosion on his plantation at Scott's Hill on February 26, 1896,
and his remains buried at the family cemetery.

References 

1839 births
1896 deaths
Democratic Party members of the North Carolina House of Representatives
Democratic Party North Carolina state senators
Democratic Party members of the United States House of Representatives from North Carolina
University of North Carolina at Chapel Hill alumni
19th-century American politicians